Durell Peaden Jr. (August 24, 1945 – June 23, 2015) was a Republican member of the Florida Senate, representing the 2nd District since November 5, 2002. He left office at the end of November 2, 2010 due to term limits.

Previously he was a member of the Florida House of Representatives's 5th district from November 8, 1994, through November 7, 2000. He switched from the Democratic party to the Republican party in June 1997.

Peaden received his bachelor's degree in chemistry from Tulane University, his medical degree at the Universidad Autónoma de Guadalajara in Jalisco, Mexico, and his law degree from the Thomas Goode Jones School of Law at Faulkner University. He and his wife had three sons: Durell III (Trey), Tyler, and Taylen.  His sons are from his previous marriage to Sharon Peaden. He is currently married wife Nancy Peaden.

Peaden was a sponsor of the 2005 Florida stand-your-ground law, which was subject to scrutiny in the 2012 killing of Trayvon Martin. Peaden died after a heart attack suffered earlier in the month on June 23, 2015, in Pittsburgh, Pennsylvania.

References

External links
Florida State Legislature - Senator Durell Peaden, Jr.- official government website 
Project Vote Smart - Senator Durell Peaden Jr. (FL) profile 
Follow the Money - Durell Peaden, Jr.: 2006 2004 2002 2000 1998 campaign contributions

1945 births
2015 deaths
Republican Party Florida state senators
Republican Party members of the Florida House of Representatives
Tulane University alumni
Thomas Goode Jones School of Law alumni
People from DeFuniak Springs, Florida
20th-century American politicians